Captain Alexander Hood (23 April 175821 April 1798) was an officer of the Royal Navy, one of several members of the Hood family to serve at sea, including his brother Sir Samuel Hood, who were both sponsored into the Royal Navy by their cousins once removed, Viscount Hood and Alexander Hood.

Career

He entered the Royal Navy in 1767, and accompanied Captain James Cook in his second voyage of exploration from 1772 to 1775.
During the American Revolutionary War, under Admirals Richard Howe and George Rodney, when he had command of the cutter Ranger in March 1780, he distinguished himself in the West Indies, and in July 1781 at the age of 23 he was promoted to captain. Shortly thereafter, he was given command of the 98-gun second rate ship of the line, . It was not uncommon for an extremely junior captain to find himself commanding a large ship-of-the-line, if that ship were the flagship of an experienced admiral, who would be able to keep a close eye on the new captain. In this case, the Barfleur was the flagship of his cousin, Admiral Sir Samuel Hood. On 5 September, they took the Barfleur into battle at the Battle of the Chesapeake, where the ship served as flagship of the Van of Sir Thomas Graves' fleet.  

At the Battle of the Saintes on 12 April 1782, Hood was in command of one of Rodney's frigates, . Later, again under his cousin's command, he proceeded to the Mona Passage, where he captured the French corvette Cérès, a former British warship that the Navy took into service as HMS Raven. Hood became close friends with the commander of his prize, the Baron de Peroy, and during the peace of 1783–1792 paid a long visit to France as his former prisoner's guest. Also married Elizabeth Periam on 11 July 1792. his son was Sir Alexander Hood, 2nd Baronet.

In the early part of the French Revolutionary Wars, ill health kept him at home, and it was not until 1797 that he went afloat again. His first experience was bitter; his ship, the 74-gun third-rate Mars, was unenviably prominent in the Spithead mutiny.

On 21 April 1798, Mars fought the Battle of the Raz de Sein with the French ship Hercule in the dusk near the Pointe du Raz on the coast of Brittany. Hercule attempted to escape through the Passage du Raz but the tide was running in the wrong direction and she was forced to anchor, giving Hood the chance to attack at close quarters. The two ships were of equal force, both seventy-fours, but Hercule was newly commissioned; after more than an hour and a half of bloody fighting at close quarters she struck her flag, having lost over three hundred men. On Mars 31 men were killed and 60 wounded. Among the dead was Captain Hood, mortally wounded in the thigh – he had been cut in the femoral artery. He is said to have died just as the sword of the French captain L'Hériter was being put in his hand.

Hood has a house named after him at The Royal Hospital School, Suffolk.

See also
His brother, Admiral Sir Samuel Hood (1762–1814).
His cousin once removed, Admiral Samuel Hood, 1st Viscount Hood (1724–1816)
His cousin once removed, Admiral Alexander Hood, 1st Viscount Bridport (1726–1814).
His grandson Admiral Lord Hood (1824–1901)

Notes

References

William James, Naval History of Great Britain, 1793–1827.

1758 births
1798 deaths
People from West Dorset District
Royal Navy officers
Royal Navy personnel of the French Revolutionary Wars
British military personnel killed in the French Revolutionary Wars
Royal Navy personnel of the American Revolutionary War
Alexander